Ear Mountain is an isolated mountain located on the Seward Peninsula in the U.S. state of Alaska. Though the mountain is located in an area long known for its tin deposits, it was only in 1953 and 1954 during a survey by the US Bureau of Mines that tin deposits were confirmed to be on Ear Mountain.

Geography
The streams rising from this mountain flow into the Arctic Ocean. However, the Arctic River and its tributaries which rise on the eastern and northeastern slopes of the mountain drain into the Shishmaref Inlet. This plateau has been correlated (matched to similar rock strata indicating a common age of formation) with the Kugruk Plateau, and is the result of erosion further into the past than that which created the York Plateau.

The vegetation in the valleys of the plateau is thinly spread with small willow bushes. Tundra forest envelops the mountain. The bedrock is permanently frozen. The mountain experiences more rain and fog than at the Shishmaref Inlet.

Geology
The sedimentary rocks surrounding Ear Mountain consist mainly of quartzites and dark slates, which resemble the slates near York and have been correlated with them. The core of the mountain is a granite boss or stock intruded in these slates. Radiating from the main granite mass there is a fringe of intrusive quartz-porphyry and rhyolite dikes which arc regarded as offshoots from the main intrusion. The granites of the main mass are coarsely crystalline and consist essentially of quartz, orthoclase, and biotite. A specimen from one of the smaller bodies, examined microscopically, is made up essentially of quartz and of orthoclase and plagioclase feldspars. A narrow dike from the same region was found to consist essentially of quartz and feldspar, with muscovite, largely secondary, and a secondary growth of feldspar surrounding the larger orthoclase crystals. In Ear Mountain, a platy structure brought out by the weathering gives the rock a stratified appearance.

Rock samples collected from the northern slopes of the mountain and streams rising from the mountain have revealed traces of tin. The mountain has an established belt of Cretaceous tin "granites". It was noted that this tin content matched well with the degree of "greisen alteration". Analyses of samples of unaltered granites pointed to a tin content of less than 80 ppm, as against the disturbed granites which showed a tin content of 950 ppm. It was also reported that the tin concentrations in "unaltered granitic rocks increase progressively from porphyritic to seriate to some equigranular rocks, indicating a progressive concentration of tin with fractional crystallization." Cassiterite is found in large quantities in placers enveloping the pluton. At the beginning of the 20th century, there were plans to lay a railroad up to Port Clarence for the purpose of tin mining.

References

Mountains of Alaska
Landforms of Nome Census Area, Alaska
Mountains of Northwest Arctic Borough, Alaska
Mountains of Unorganized Borough, Alaska
Landforms of the Seward Peninsula